Shuwpagwe Qalawebateqo was a Circassian politician and military commander who served as the 1st leader of the Circassian Confederation from 1807 to 1827. He took part in the Russo-Circassian War. Not much is recorded about Qalawebateqo.

Biography

Early life 
Not much is recorded about Qalawebateqo, as Circassians did not write down their history, and all knowledge comes from Russian and British sources. His exact birth date is not known. Of Circassian Natukhaj nobility, he was raised with a martial education.

Name 
His name translates to "Shuwpagwe, son of Qalubat". In 1807, Shuwpagwe Qalawebateqo self-proclaimed himself as the leader of the Circassian confederation, and divided Circassia into 12 major regions.

Participation in the Russo-Circassian War 
Qalawebateqo was a respected person all around Circassia and fought in the Russo-Circassian War.

Leadership 
In 1807, Shuwpagwe Qalawebateqo self-proclaimed himself as the leader of the Circassian confederation, and divided Circassia into 12 major regions. These regions were Shapsugo-Natukhaj, Abdzakh, Chemguy, Barakay, Bzhedug, Kabardo-Besleney, Hatuqway, Makhosh, Bashilbey, Taberda, Abkhazia and Ubykh.

In 1827, Ismail Berzeg officially declared the military confederation of the Circassian tribes. By the end of 1839, he managed to unite a significant part of the population under his control. His nominal reign therefore came to an end.

Death 
His death circumstances are not recorded in Russian, British or Circassian sources, and remain unknown.

References 

People of the Caucasian War
North Caucasian independence activists
Circassian military personnel of the Russo-Circassian War
Circassian nobility